The 2022–23 Georgetown Hoyas men's basketball team represented Georgetown University in the 2022–23 NCAA Division I men's basketball season. The Hoyas, led by sixth-year head coach Patrick Ewing, were members of the Big East Conference. The Hoyas played their home games at Capital One Arena in Washington, D.C. They finished the season 7–24, 2–18 in Big East play to finish in last place for the second consecutive year. As the No. 11 seed in the Big East tournament, they lost to Villanova in the opening round, and had no postseason play.

The Hoyas struggled with a 13–50 record between 2021 and 2023. On March 9th, 2023, Georgetown announced that they had fired head coach Patrick Ewing.

Previous season
Due to the COVID-19 pandemic, the Hoyas had one conference game canceled during the 2020–2021 season. They had an historically bad season, posting a final record of 6–25. They went 0–19 in Big East play, and finished in last place in the 11-team conference. In the Big East tournament, they lost to Seton Hall in the first round, bringing their season to an end.

Offseason

Departures

Incoming transfers

NOTE: Qudus Wahab previously played for Georgetown during the 2019–2020 and 2020–2021 seasons.

2022 recruiting class

Roster

Season recap

Non-conference season

Georgetown met Northwestern in the Gavitt Tipoff Games on November 15. It will be the first meeting of the schools.

Georgetown participated in the 2022 Jamaica Classic at Montego Bay, Jamaica, November 18–20, 2022. Other reported participants include Green Bay, La Salle, Loyola Marymount, Utah Valley, and Wake Forest. The Hoyas are expected to meet Loyola Marymount first, then either La Salle or Wake Forest.

Georgetown participated in the final year of the Big East–Big 12 Battle, playing at Texas Tech on November 30, 2022.

Georgetown met South Carolina at Capital One Arena in the second year of a two-year home-and-home series that began in the 2021–2022 season.

Georgetown played at Syracuse on December 10, 2022.

Conference season

Georgetown played a 20-game conference season, meeting each Big East opponent in a home-and-home series.

Big East tournament

The 2023 Big East tournament took place March 8–11, 2023, at Madison Square Garden in New York City.

Schedule and results

|-
!colspan=9 style=| Non-conference regular season

|-
!colspan=9 style=|Big East regular season

|-
!colspan=9 style="|Big East tournament

Awards and honors

Big East Conference honors

References

Georgetown Hoyas
Georgetown Hoyas men's basketball seasons
Georgetown Hoyas men's basketball team
Georgetown Hoyas men's basketball team